A lockset (alternatively lock set) is the hardware and components that make up the locking or latching mechanism that can usually be found on a door or other hinged object but can also include sliding doors and dividers. The components of a lockset can include (but are not limited to) the door handles (commonly both inside and outside), latch bolt, dead bolt, face plate, strike plate, escutcheon, thumbturn, push button, turn button, and other trim. 
The lockset and associated hardware typically defines a door's function and how a user could (or could not) access the two adjacent spaces defined by the opening associated with the lockset.

Regulation
The Americans with Disabilities Act of 1990, under Title III, and many state and local governments regulate locksets in buildings occupied by the public. Typically, locksets that employ doorknob-controlled latches are forbidden for public use in favor of lever handles, which are easier to operate by gravity instead of the grasping and turning required by knobs. Many municipalities also regulate locksets in terms of fire rating, using standards determined more broadly by national or international organizations such as Underwriters Laboratories in the United States or the International Code Council, which are often supplemented by local governmental organizations (e.g. New York City's Materials and Equipment Acceptance (MEA) Division of their Board of Standards and Appeals (BSA)), or by local building codes. For example, mandates of building code may forbid (e.g., E2141/F16 "Double-Keyed Deadbolt") from group occupancies, or require (e.g., F93/F15) certain functions on hotel or motel doors.

Industry standards
The American National Standards Institute (ANSI), a private non-profit organization, and the Builders Hardware Manufacturers Association (BHMA)  administer and coordinate voluntary standardization to develop and maintain performance standards for builder's hardware. Locks and handle sets are covered by standard A156.2, deadbolts by A156.5, and finishes by A156.18.

Aspects of a lockset

Three standard grades
The grade specified according to the standards of ANSI/BHMA indicate the security and durability of the lockset. 
 Grade 1  Commercial, highest grade security and durability.
 Grade 2  Residential, with excellent security and durability.
 Grade 3  Residential, minimum acceptable grade.

Two lockset mechanisms
The lockset's latching (locking) mechanism may be of the mortise or cylindrical type. The mortise mechanism is enclosed in a box (usually metal), requiring installation in a rectangular cavity carved into the edge of the door. The cylindrical mechanism is typically installed into the door via a cavity that can be simply bored through the door, usually by using a hole saw.

Two types of latches
A lockset may incorporate a latch bolt, a deadbolt, or may integrate both into a single lockset.
 Latch bolt The latch bolt is spring-loaded and has an angled surface, allowing the door to be closed and latched without first retracting the bolt. In addition, the bolt may be fitted with a guardbolt, which is arranged to prevent the unwanted retraction of the latch bolt by an intruder; in this case the latch bolt is called a deadlocking latch bolt. There may be a provision on the inside handle to disable (lock) the outside handle from operating the latch bolt; this is referred to in the table below as the "inside locking mechanism". This mechanism may consist of a push button or turn button in the inside handle.

 Deadbolt A deadbolt is projected (thrown) only after the door is in the closed position; it will resist being forcibly retracted once it is in its projected position, hence is known as a deadlock. If it is projected or retracted by a handle (rather than by a key), that handle is referred to in the table below as a "thumbturn".

Keyed and non-keyed locksets
A lockset may be fitted with a keyable lock on inside, on outside, or not at all, the latter being known as a "non-keyed lockset". If the lockset has a single keyed side, it is called a "keyed, single-cylinder lockset"; if both sides are keyed, it is called a "keyed, double-cylinder lockset". In this aspect, the word "cylinder" refers to any type of keyed cylinder lock, rather than to the type of mechanism of the lockset.

Door function
Locksets come in many variant types, each appropriate to a particular use.
Lockset manufacturers may describe a lockset product in terms of how a door is operated by a user, while ANSI/BHMA  assign standard alphanumeric codes to the function of a lockset. For accurate and precise descriptions, the standard function code should be used when specifying a lockset.

 Closet door  May use a lockset consisting of two operating handles, both of which are never locked. A cylindrical mechanism lockset on such a door would be given the ANSI code F75, a mortised lockset F01.

 Bathroom/WC  A lockset for such a door typically includes a provision to lock from the inside, preserving the privacy of the occupant, along with a means of unlocking from the outside in case of emergency (lockset F76B/F19).

 Office Door  A typical use case occurs upon departing the office: the user pushes a button on the inside handle, locking the door, then pulls the door shut behind. The door must now be opened with a key. The F82(F04) function works for this case.

 Server Room  For enhanced security, the addition of a deadbolt is useful. The F88/F09 "Entrance" function allows the door to be locked from the outside with a key, while still allowing people inside to freely leave without a key.

 Break Room  Door may be specified as non-locking; the F75/F01 "Passage" function serves the purpose.

 Medical Storage Closet  Door should be locked at all times, calling for the F86/F07 "Storeroom" function.

 Classroom function  Designated F84/F05, which allows occupants out of the room regardless if the door is locked. In the wake of school shootings, the F110 lockset may be desirable: it allows the outside handle to be locked by using a key on the inside, but still allows occupants free egress.

ANSI/BHMA door function codes

 The latch bolt may be specified as the deadlocking type; if so, the fact is explicitly stated. 
 A deadbolt, if present, automatically deadlocks when fully projected.  
 In the table below, "handle" may refer to either a lever or a knob; the former is preferred equipment for usability sake. Some manufacturers refer to "trim". 
 "Inoperable" may be considered synonymous with "locked"; the locked handle may be immovable, or it may freely turn but without opening the door. For some manufacturers' locksets, a locked handle is immoveable, and they use the term "rigid" in referring to a handle that is locked. 
 The inside handle may have an affordance for locking the latch bolt: it may be a push button, a turn button, or may operate in both modes. It is referred to in the table as the "inside locking mechanism". 
 There may be an (inside) affordance to project or retract the deadbolt; it is referred to in the table below as a "thumbturn". 
 In some lockset functions, the inside handle retracts the latch (and deadbolt, if present) even when the door is locked; this feature is intended to allow those inside to open the door without difficulty under possible emergency circumstances. 
 In some lockset functions, operating the inside handle or closing the door has the effect of canceling the lock on the outside handle; this feature may be thought of as protecting the user from inadvertently locking him- or herself out.

References

External links 

Locks (security device)